Haider is a predominantly Arabic name, with alternative spellings such as Haidar, Haydar and Heydar. Notable people with the name include:

Given name
Haider Al-Abadi, Iraqi politician
Haider Ackermann (born 1971), French fashion designer
Haider Ali (athlete) (born 1984), all-round Pakistani Paralympic athlete
Haider Ali (boxer) (born 1979), Pakistani Olympic boxer
Haider Ali Kohari (born 17th century), military general and secretary of the Maratha king Shivaji
Haider Aziz Safwi, Indian politician
Haider Hussain (singer-songwriter), Bangladeshi singer-songwriter

Haider Jabreen (born 1981), Iraqi discus thrower, also known as Haidar Nasir (born 1981) 
Haider Mahmoud (born 1942), Jordanian-Palestinian poet 
Haider Nawzad (born 1983), Iraqi rower, also known as Haydar Nozad, Haidar Hama Rashid
Haider Qureshi (born 1953), Pakistani Urdu poet, writer and journalist 
Haider Rahman, Pakistani musician
Haider Zaman Khan, Pakistan politician and administrator

Middle name
Abdulelah Haider Shaye (born c. 1977), Yemeni journalist, also known as Abd al-Ilah Haydar Al-Sha'i
 Ali Haider Khan (1896–1963), Nawab of Sylhet, Bengali politician 
Ali Haider Multani (1690–1785), Sufi Punjabi poet
Ghulam Haider Hamidi (1945–2011), mayor of Kandahar, Afghanistan
Ghulam Haider Wyne, Pakistani politician
Khaqan Haider Ghazi (born 1965), Punjabi poet
Mufazzal Haider Chaudhury (1926–1971), Bengali essayist, scholar and educator
Nawab Haider Naqvi, Pakistani economist and scholar
Rafique Haider Khan Leghari (born 1951), Pakistani politician, minister
Shamim Haider Tirmazi (born 1939), Pakistani author

Surname
Adil Haider, Pakistani–American trauma surgeon
Afzaal Haider (born 1971), Pakistani-born Hong Kong cricketer
Ali Haider (cricketer) (born 1988), Pakistani cricketer
Ali Haider, Pakistani singer and actor
Andreas Haider-Maurer (born 1987), Austrian tennis player
Ernst Haider (1890–1988), German painter and graphic artist
Farooq Haider Khan, 12th Prime Minister of Azad Jammu and Kashmir 
Ghazi-ud-Din Haider (born c. 1769 – 1827), last nawab wazir of Oudh (1814–1818) and first King of Oudh (1818–1827)
Ghulam Haider, music composer well known in both India and Pakistan
Ilse Haider (born 1965), Austrian artist
Iqbal Haider (1945–2012), advocate of the Supreme Court of Pakistan, co-chair of the Human Rights Commission of Pakistan
Izhar Haider (1944–2009), Urdu poet, social worker, broadcaster
Jalila Haider, a Human rights attorney and political activist
Jörg Haider (1950–2008), Austrian politician
Karl Michael Haider (1846–1912), German painter
Maximilian Haider (born 1950), Austrian physicist
Michael Lawrence Haider (1904–1986), American petroleum engineer and executive
Moinuddin Haider (born 1942), Pakistani general
Mohsin Abbas Haider, Pakistani singer, actor, writer and TV presenter
Nasiruddin Haider (born c. 1803 – 1837), second King of Oudh (1827–1837)
Rashid Haider, Bangladeshi author and novelist
Sajjad Haider (born 1966), Indian journalist media personality
Sarah Haider, Pakistani-American writer
Sayed Haider (1925–2020), Bangladeshi physician and Language Movement activist
Sepp Haider (born 1953), Austrian rally driver
Shuja Haider, Pakistani singer, songwriter, composer, music director and record producer
Syed Afzal Haider, Pakistani politician
Wasim Haider (born 1967), Pakistani cricketer 
Zameer Haider (born 1962), Pakistani international cricket umpire
Zulqarnain Haider (born 1986), Pakistani cricketer

See also
Haydar (for more variant spellings)